Ptychobela zebra is a species of sea snail, a marine gastropod mollusk in the family Pseudomelatomidae, the turrids and allies.

Description
The shell reaches  in length.

The protoconch consists of two smooth whorls. The eight subsequent whorls contain thirteen axial ribs, crossed by (ten on the penultimate whorl) fine and unequal spiral cords forming brown nodules. The shell is cream-colored.

Distribution
This marine species occurs off the Philippines.

References

 Chang CK, Wu WL. 2000. The Taiwan inquisitors (Gastropoda: Turridae). Bull MalacolTaiwan. 24:13–26

zebra
Gastropods described in 2000